The competition of the men's 10 metre platform  was held on June 6, the fifth and last day of the 2010 FINA Diving World Cup.

Results

Green denotes finalists

LEGEND

WDR = Withdrew

2010 FINA Diving World Cup